Haringey London Borough Council is the local authority for the London Borough of Haringey in Greater London, England. It is a London borough council, one of 32 in the United Kingdom capital of London. As of 2022, Haringey is divided into 21 wards, 6 electing two councillors and the remaining 15 electing three. Haringey London Borough Council currently comprises 49 Labour Party councillors, 7 Liberal Democrats after the 2022 election and one independent member who was expelled from the Labour Party.

History
There have previously been a number of local authorities responsible for the Haringey area. The current local authority was first elected in 1964, a year before formally coming into its powers and prior to the creation of the London Borough of Haringey on 1 April 1965. It replaced three local authorities: Hornsey Borough Council, Tottenham Borough Council and Wood Green Borough Council.

It was envisaged that through the London Government Act 1963 Haringey as a London local authority would share power with the Greater London Council. The split of powers and functions meant that the Greater London Council was responsible for "wide area" services such as fire, ambulance, flood prevention, and refuse disposal; with the local authorities responsible for "personal" services such as social care, libraries, cemeteries and refuse collection. As an outer London borough council it has been an education authority since 1965. This arrangement lasted until 1986 when Haringey London Borough Council gained responsibility for some services that had been provided by the Greater London Council, such as waste disposal. Since 2000 the Greater London Authority has taken some responsibility for highways and planning control from the council, but within the English local government system the council remains a "most purpose" authority in terms of the available range of powers and functions.

In 2017, the Council proposed a partnership with Lendlease Group for developing council-owned land known as the Haringey Development Vehicle, which was controversial locally. The subsequent political fall-out led to the resignation of council leader Claire Kober.

Powers and functions
The local authority derives its powers and functions from the London Government Act 1963 and subsequent legislation, and has the powers and functions of a London borough council. It sets council tax and as a billing authority also collects precepts for Greater London Authority functions and business rates. It sets planning policies which complement Greater London Authority and national policies, and decides on almost all planning applications accordingly.  It is a local education authority  and is also responsible for council housing, social services, libraries, waste collection and disposal, traffic, and most roads and environmental health.

Summary results of elections

References

Local authorities in London
London borough councils
Politics of the London Borough of Haringey
Leader and cabinet executives
Local education authorities in England
Billing authorities in England